House of Lungula is a 2013 Kenyan comedy film directed by Alexandros Konstantaras. It focuses on the sex life of typical Kenyans. The word "lungula" means "sex" in Kenyan slang, Sheng. The film stars Gerald Langiri, Lizz Njagah and Ian Mbugua.

Langiri plays a hardworking man who needs money to pay for his fiancé's dowry, while Njagah plays a wife who decides to play a tit-for-tat game when she finds out that her husband had a mistress. Mbugua plays a man who maintains a secret relationship with a younger woman, played by Sarah Hassan, who in turn represents girls who date older men for money.

The film was rated 18+ by the Kenya Film Board Association.

Plot
Harrison (Gerald Langiri) urgently requires money to pay for the dowry of his fiancée, Charity (Nice Githinji). Through his boss, Mr. Taylor (Ian Mbugua), he gains access to a huge house belonging to  their company's CEO, Mr. Lungula. He is charged with cleaning the house for a  fee. A posh empty house presents an opportunity and under the right circumstances could generate some quick cash. Alex (Lenana Kariba), Harrison's friend and co-worker, is looking for a place to entertain a 'client' for a day. For the right fee, he gains access to the house of Lungula, but with conditions of course. Mr. and Mrs. Taylor's (Lizz Njagah) marriage is rocky, and she has suspicions that her husband is cheating. Sahara (Helena Waithera)  provides a solution, an eye for an eye. To be fair, these suspicions are not entirely unfounded as Mr. Taylor is a very naughty man, slinging around the beautiful Chichi (Sarah Hassan) while he's supposed to be at the office. Chichi on the other hand also has a lover, Tito (Gitau Ngogoyo), to make the plot even more complex. Surprisingly all the characters land at the house of Lungula. The secrets are revealed and relationships are at stake.

Cast
 Lizz Njagah as Lola Taylor
 Gerald Langiri as Harrisson Hamisi
 Ian Mbugua as Chris Taylor
 Lenana Kariba as Alex Kijani
 Sarah Hassan as Chichi
 Nice Githinji as Charity
 Gitau Ngogoyo as Titus "Tito"
 Helena Waithera as Sahara
 Lydia Nyambura as Lydia
 Diana Nekoye Sifuna as Diana
 Sheila Kwamboka as Cop

Music
House of Lungula featured a number of musical works that were mainly by Kenyan artists. Ni Sisi Band performed "(Give it all to me) House of Lungula", which was the main soundtrack for the film. The film  also featured Chuom 32 alongside Doreen Nyawira  performing "House of Lungula OST".

Reception
House of Lungula generally received positive reviews among youths and the younger generation in Kenya due to its humour. It was awarded 11 nominations in the 2015 Kalasha Awards. It  won the Best Script award.

Awards

References

External links

2013 films
2013 comedy films
Kenyan comedy films